The men's triple jump event at the 1971 Pan American Games was held in Cali on 5 August.

Results

References

Athletics at the 1971 Pan American Games
1971